This is a list of United States national Golden Gloves champions in the light middleweight division, along with the state or region they represented. The weight limit for light middleweights was contested at  until the division was discontinued after 2002.

1967 - Jesse Valdez - Fort Worth, TX 
1968 - William Beeler - Louisville, KY 
1969 - Morris Jordan - Cincinnati, OH 
1970 - William Beeler - Louisville, KY 
1971 - Sammy NeSmith - Indianapolis, IN 
1972 - Lamont Lovelady - Iowa 
1973 - Dale Grant - Tacoma, WA 
1974 - Michael Spinks - St. Louis, MO 
1975 - Ray Phillips - Fort Worth, TX 
1976 - Peter Bouchard - Boston, MA 
1977 - Curtis Parker - Philadelphia, PA 
1978 - Donald Bowers - Jackson, TN 
1979 - James Shuler - Philadelphia, PA 
1980 - James Shuler - Philadelphia, PA 
1981 - Alfred Mayes - St. Louis, MO 
1982 - Sanderline Williams - Cleveland, OH 
1983 - Frank Tate - Detroit, MI 
1984 - Ron Essett - Indiana 
1985 - Mylon Watkins - Las Vegas, NV 
1986 - Mylon Watkins - Las Vegas, NV 
1987 - Roy Jones Jr., Pensacola, FL 
1988 - Ray McElroy - Los Angeles, CA 
1989 - Mario Munoz
1990 - Ravea Springs - Cincinnati, OH 
1991 - Kevin Bonner - Nevada 
1992 - Lonnie Bradley - New York, NY 
1993 - Darnell Wilson - Indiana 
1994 - Mike Nunnally - Milwaukee, WI 
1994 - Anthony W Melberg - Victorville, CA
1995 - Randie Carver - Kansas City, MO 
1996 - Dwain Williams - California 
1997 - Cleveland Corder - Idaho 
1998 - Jermain Taylor - Little Rock, AR 
1999 - Jermain Taylor - Little Rock, AR 
2000 - Sechew Powell
2001 - Andre Berto
2002 - Jesse Briseno
2007 - James Brumley Manchester, Kentucky 
2008 - Khanh Nguyen Chino K - Dallas Texas
2019 - Kaitlyn Weber- Reynoldsville, PA

References

Golden Gloves